The Swell Season is the self-titled and first album by the duo The Swell Season, (Glen Hansard and Markéta Irglová), released in 2006. "Falling Slowly" went on to be nominated for a Grammy and win the Academy Award for Best Original Song in 2008.

Track listing
 "This Low" (Glen Hansard)
 "Sleeping" (Glen Hansard)
 "Falling Slowly" (Glen Hansard, Markéta Irglová)
 "Drown Out" (Glen Hansard, Markéta Irglová (chorus only))
 "Lies" (Glen Hansard, Markéta Irglová)
 "When Your Mind's Made Up" (Glen Hansard)
 "The Swell Season" (Markéta Irglová)
 "Leave" (Glen Hansard)
 "The Moon" (Glen Hansard, Markéta Irglová (chorus only))
 "Alone Apart" (Markéta Irglová, Glen Hansard (guitar only))

Personnel
 Glen Hansard - guitar, vocals
 Markéta Irglová - piano, vocals
 Marja Tuhkanen - violin, viola
 Bertrand Galen - cello

External links
theswellseason.com
The Swell Season MySpace Blog

References

The Swell Season albums
2006 debut albums